The Little Gypsy is a lost 1915 silent film drama directed by Oscar Apfel and starring Dorothy Bernard. It was produced by William Fox and released through Fox Film Corporation.

Cast
Dorothy Bernard - Babbie
Thurlow Bergen - Gavin
Raymond Murray -
W. J. Herbert -
Bradley Barker -
Julia Hurley -
Riley Hatch -

See also
1937 Fox vault fire

References

External links
 The Little Gypsy at IMDb.com

1915 films
Lost American films
Films directed by Oscar Apfel
Fox Film films
American silent feature films
American black-and-white films
Silent American drama films
1915 drama films
1915 lost films
Lost drama films
1910s American films